The Melbourne Victory Player of the Season, also known as the Victory Medal, is an award presented to the Melbourne Victory coaching staff's player of the season.

The first winner of the award was Kevin Muscat in 2006, who became the first player to win it twice in 2007. Since then, three other players have won the award more than once: Danny Allsopp (2007 and 2009), Archie Thompson (2008 and 2010) and Leigh Broxham (2019 and 2020). Muscat won again in 2009 to become first player to receive the award thrice.

Voting takes place on a 3-2-1 basis, as allocated by the Melbourne Victory coaching staff.

Other end-of-season awards given by Melbourne Victory include the Players' Player of the Year Award and the Goal of the Season Award. The prizes for all awards are given at an annual awards night, which is held near the end of the league season.

Winners
Players in bold are still playing for Melbourne Victory

Statistics

Players with multiple wins

Wins by playing position

Wins by nationality

References

External links

Melbourne Victory FC
Association football player non-biographical articles